Trovoada is a surname. Notable people with the surname include:

Miguel Trovoada (born 1936), São Toméan politician
Patrice Trovoada (born 1962), São Toméan politician